Min Marion (My Marion) is a Norwegian drama film from 1975 directed by Nils R. Müller. It is based on Terje Stigen's 1972 novel Min Marion.

Plot
The film tells the story of a love affair between two adults, Marion and Georg. Marion (played by Ulrikke Greve) is disabled and her face has been disfigured since birth. Georg (played by Sverre Anker Ousdal) was disabled as the result of a car accident. The two people of them have experienced good and bad in life and have encountered much resistance. Together they find strength in each other, and the two of them limp along together on their own legs. The film is a sensitive portrayal of a different kind of love story.

Cast
 Ulrikke Greve: Marion
 Sverre Anker Ousdal: Georg
 Sverre Hansen: a supervisor
 Johan Kjelsberg: Hammerstein
 Mette Lange-Nielsen: the landlady
 Arne Lie: the landlord
 Eli Anne Linnestad: Anne-Lise
 William Nyrén: a tenant
 Siri Rom: Marion's mother
 Irene Thomsen: the tenant's wife
 Per Tofte: Aron
 Asbjørn Toms: a farmer
 Ottar Wicklund: Marion's father
 Sverre Wilberg: a photographer
 Arne Aas: Leonid

Release
The film premiered on July 28, 1975. The film was also issued on VHS in the Norske klassikere series in the 1990s, but it was not issued on DVD. Regarding the film, the director, Nils R. Müller, stated that "We all have our handicaps, our burdens, but this does not make it less suitable to love, to love another person."

References

External links 
 
 Nasjonalbiblioteket: Norsk filmografi: Min Marion.
 Filweb.no: Min Marion.

Norwegian drama films
1970s Norwegian-language films
1975 films
1975 drama films